Tapan Mitra (18 July 1948 – 3 February 2019) was an Indian-born economist.

Life and career 
Tapan Mitra was born to parents Ashok and Santi Mitra. He attended St. Xavier's High School, Bombay, and Rajkumar College, Raipur. In 1968, Mitra graduated from the University of Calcutta with a degree in economics. He further studied the subject, completing a master's degree at Delhi University two years later. Mitra subsequently immigrated to the United States, where he obtained a second master's in economics, followed by a doctorate in the same subject at the University of Rochester in 1973 and 1975 respectively. He lectured at Rochester while working toward his Ph.D, joining the University of Illinois at Chicago in 1974 as an assistant professor. Mitra moved to the Stony Brook University in 1976, where he was later appointed associate professor. He began teaching at Cornell University in 1981 as full professor of economics. In 1997, Mitra was elected a fellow of the Econometric Society, and was named the Goldwin Smith Professor of Economics at Cornell in 2007. In 2016, Mitra endowed a set of prizes awarded by the Department of Economics.

References

1948 births
2019 deaths
Indian expatriates in the United States
Indian expatriate academics
20th-century Indian economists
21st-century Indian economists
University of Rochester alumni
University of Calcutta alumni
Delhi University alumni
University of Illinois Chicago faculty
Stony Brook University faculty
Cornell University faculty
Fellows of the Econometric Society
Sloan Fellows